Follow Thru is a 1930 American pre-Code musical romantic comedy film photographed entirely in Technicolor. It was the second all-color all-talking feature to be produced by Paramount Pictures. The film was based on the hit 1929 Broadway musical of the same name by Lew Brown, B. G. DeSylva, Ray Henderson and Laurence Schwab. The musical ran a total of 401 performances from January 9, 1929 to December 21, 1929. Jack Haley and Zelma O'Neal, who starred in the Broadway production, reprised their roles in the film version.

The film is one of dozens of musicals made in 1929 and 1930 following the advent of sound, and it is one of several to feature color cinematography. Though many of these films have been lost or were destroyed by the original studios, the original camera negative of Follow Thru survives in its entirety and in excellent condition. It has been preserved by the UCLA Film and Television Archive.

Cast
Charles "Buddy" Rogers as Jerry Downes
Nancy Carroll as Lora Moore
Zelma O'Neal as Angie Howard
Jack Haley as Jack Martin
Eugene Pallette as J.C. Effingham
Thelma Todd as Mrs Van Horn
Claude King as Mac Moore
Kathryn Givney as Mrs Bascomb
Margaret Lee as Babs Bascomb
Don Tomkins as Dinty Moore
Albert Gran as Martin Bascomb

Songs
"A Peach of a Pair" by George Marion Jr. (lyrics), Richard A. Whiting (music) 
"It Must Be You" by Elwood Eliscu and Manning Sherwin (lyrics and music) 
"Then I'll Have Time for You," "I Want to be Bad" and "Button Up Your Overcoat" by Lew Brown and B. G. DeSylva (lyrics), Ray Henderson (music)

Production
The film was shot in Los Angeles and Palm Springs. The extras who appear in golf course scenes had to be coached with regards to golf etiquette (when to applaud a strike, etc.). About two hundred extras were used for the climactic golf championship sequence.

Preservation
For a long time, the film was believed to be lost, but a print was found in the 1990s and it was carefully restored and preserved by the UCLA Film and Television Archive.

See also
List of early color feature films

References

External links
 
 
 
 

1930 films
1930s color films
1930 musical comedy films
American musical comedy films
American romantic comedy films
American films based on plays
Films directed by Lloyd Corrigan
Films shot in Los Angeles
Golf films
Paramount Pictures films
1930s rediscovered films
1930 romantic comedy films
Rediscovered American films
Early color films
1930s English-language films
1930s American films